Rodrigo Duarte Ribeiro (born 28 April 2005) is a Portuguese professional footballer who plays as a forward for Primeira Liga club Sporting CP.

Club career
A youth product of Perspectiva em Jogo, Alfenense, and Sporting CP, Ribeiro signed his first professional contract with Sporting on 13 May 2021. He was promoted to the senior team of Sporting on 8 March 2022. He made his professional debut with Sporting CP in a 0–0 UEFA Champions League tie with Manchester City on 9 March 2022, coming on as a late sub in the 91' minute.

International career
Ribeiro is a youth international for Portugal, having represented the Portugal U16 and U17s.

References

External links

Sporting Profile

2005 births
People from Viana do Castelo
Living people
Portuguese footballers
Portugal youth international footballers
Association football forwards
Sporting CP footballers
Primeira Liga players
Sportspeople from Viana do Castelo District